The Adventures of Hal 5 is a 1958 British adventure film from the Children's Film Foundation (CCF). It was an early directorial effort from Don Sharp.

Premise
Hal 5, an old car, is discovered by two children and purchased by their uncle, a vicar (William Russell). The garage proprietor, Goorlie, conceals Hal's faulty transmission.

Cast
William Russell as the vicar
John Glyn-Jones as Mr. Goorlie
David Morrell as Mr. Dicey
Edwin Richfield as Cooper
Kathleen Williams as Grannie
Peter Godsell as Charles
Janina Faye as Moira
Michael Maguire as Ginger
Ian Higginson as Titch
Martin Boddey as the doctor
Bartlett Mullins as Ben

Production
The film was made by Don Sharp who had previously directed The Stolen Airliner for the CCF.

Reception
The Monthly Film Bulletin called The Adventures of Hal 5 "a charming little film."

Robert Shall, who wrote a book on CCF movies, had Hal 5 "combines two favorite CFF elements: gentle fantasy and nostalgic affection for vintage vehicles of varying kinds...the appeal, apart from the charming anthropomorphic car, lies in the presentation of a rural idyll... the pace is particularly leisurely."

References

External links
 
 Films at Childrens Film and Television Foundation
 

1958 films
British adventure films
1958 adventure films
1950s English-language films
1950s British films